J. & L. Lobmeyr is a glassware company from Vienna, Austria. It was founded in 1823 and is still family owned.

History
The company was founded in 1823 by Josef Lobmeyr (17 March 1792 - 8 May 1855).  When his children acquired the company they renamed it J. & L. Lobmeyr, named after his son Joseph and brother Louis. Joseph became the marketing director and Louis managed the art department. Ludwig Lobmeyr (2 August 1829 - 25 March 1917) developed further professional relationships with Bohemian glassworks and glass making companies. They had an office at Kamenický Šenov and partners included Wilhelm Kralik of Meyrswalden.

J. & L. Lobmeyr provided a crystal chandelier for Schönbrunn Palace and other clients. They also had a partnership with Thomas Edison. They co-developed the first electric chandeliers in the world, in 1880, with Edison. They provided services for the King of Belgium, the Duke of Brabant, and the Court of Flanders. In 1906 they opened an office in Karlovy Vary. Around this time, clients included Archduke Franz Ferdinand of Austria. In recognition of their services, they were titled purveyor to the Imperial Court. In 1917, Louis died. The company was left to Stefan Rath (1876-1960), Louis' nephew. Additional clients included the Vienna State Opera, the Metropolitan Opera, the John F. Kennedy Center for the Performing Arts, and the Kremlin. As of 1962, Rath had written a history of the family and company.

Today, the company is still owned by Rath's grand children Andreas, Leonid and Johannes.

References

External links 

 Official homepage of Lobmeyr

1823 establishments in the Austrian Empire
Belgian Royal Warrant holders
Companies based in Vienna
Glassmaking companies of Austria
Austrian brands
Purveyors to the Imperial and Royal Court
Wiener Werkstätte
Chandeliers